Ruben Bemelmans and Laurynas Grigelis were the defending champions, but chose not to participate.

Chris Guccione and Artem Sitak won the tournament, defeating Yuki Bhambri and Matthew Ebden in the final, 6–4, 7–6(7–2).

Seeds

Draw

References 

Comerica Bank Challenger - Doubles
Nordic Naturals Challenger